The Chehalis language is a collective expression regarding two languages, Upper Chehalis language and Lower Chehalis language.  Both are members of the Tsamosan (Olympic) branch within the Coast Salish subfamily of the Salishan language family.

Alternatively "Chehalis" may refer to one of the two different languages:
Upper Chehalis language
Lower Chehalis language

Chehalis is now extinct.  However, it contributed to Chinook Jargon.  For more information, see Salishan languages.

Interior Salish languages
Languages of the United States
Former disambiguation pages converted to set index articles